Yayar Kunath (born 7 February 1989) is a Thai footballer who plays as a right winger for TSV Buchholz 08.

Career

Kunath was born in Satun, Thailand.

During the summer, Kunath would play for the European Football Academy in England, where he lived with an uncle. At age 17, he went to Bahrain through one of his coaches who wanted to establish a football academy there, where he helped coach youth teams and played in the first and second divisions. After that, Kunath waited for a transfer to England but it never happened.

In 2013, Kunath trialed with Suphanburi in Thailand, but failed to earn a contract because they said he was too small. In 2018, he returned to Thailand with Nakhon Ratchasima, where he played for two seasons.

In 2020, he signed for TSV Bucholz 08.

References

External links
 
 

Living people
1989 births
Yayar Kunath
Yayar Kunath
Association football wingers
FC Eintracht Norderstedt 03 players
Yayar Kunath
Regionalliga players
Yayar Kunath